The 2013 Autobacs Super GT Series was the twenty-first season of the Japan Automobile Federation Super GT Championship including the All Japan Grand Touring Car Championship (JGTC) era, and the ninth season under the name Super GT. It marked the thirty-first season overall of a Japanese professional sportscar championship dating back to the All Japan Sports Prototype Championship. It was the final year of the GT500 regulations introduced in 2010 as the 2014 season would see unified technical regulations with the Deutsche Tourenwagen Masters. The season began on April 7 and ended on November 17, 2013 after 8 regular races and 1 non championship event.

Apart the series' 8 points-scoring races, the 3 Hours of Fuji, a part of 2013 Asian Le Mans Series organized by Automobile Club de l'Ouest, also counted for points towards the GT300 class.

Schedule
An updated provisional calendar was released on November 1, 2012.

Notes:
There was originally a non-championship race to be held at the Korea International Circuit scheduled for May 19 but was postponed and not held during the season.
 — The 3 Hours of Fuji is an optional points-scoring round that is only open to teams competing in the GT300 class, held as a part of the 2013 Asian Le Mans Series season, where the cars were reclassified as "SGT". Points and success ballast were to be counted if points were awarded to the top 10 finishers in the SGT class; no penalty was to be imposed on success ballast reduction if entrants miss the race.
 — Originally scheduled for November 16 and 17 but rescheduled to November 23 and 24.

Drivers and teams

GT500

GT300

Entrant Changes

GT500 Class 

 Nissan: Two-time and defending GT500 champions Masataka Yanagida and Ronnie Quintarelli, transferred from MOLA to the flagship NISMO team, who also switched from Bridgestone to Michelin tyres. Three-time GT500 champion Satoshi Motoyama transferred to MOLA, joining first-year GT500 driver Yuhi Sekiguchi in an all-new lineup. Two-time GT500 champion Michael Krumm transferred to Kondo Racing.
 Lexus: TOM's Racing expanded to a two-car team, with the number 37 Lexus Team KeePer TOM's squad taking over the entry vacated by Team Kraft's departure. Loïc Duval departed Super GT to drive full-time for Audi in the FIA World Endurance Championship, and was replaced by former Force India F1 reserve driver James Rossiter. Daisuke Ito and Andrea Caldarelli were named as the drivers for Lexus Team KeePer TOM's, while Yuji Kunimoto transferred to Lexus Team Eneos LeMans to replace Ito. Lexus Team SARD switched to Bridgestone tyres after two seasons with Michelin.
 Honda: FIA GT1 World Championship runner-up Frédéric Makowiecki replaced Carlo Van Dam at Weider Modulo Dome Racing, joined by Naoki Yamamoto, who transferred from Team Kunimitsu after four seasons. Dome also changed tyre suppliers from Bridgestone to Michelin. 2010 GT500 champion Takashi Kogure was transferred to Team Kunimitsu to replace Yamamoto. Kosuke Matsuura returned to the GT500 class with ARTA, and Daisuke Nakajima stepped up to GT500 for the first time with Nakajima Racing.

GT300 Class 

 Team Taisan Ken Endless inherited the number 0 from last year's champions, Goodsmile Racing & Studie with Team UKYO. This began an informal tradition of GT300 teams designating the number 0 as the champion's number plate.
 Goodsmile Racing & Studie with Team UKYO consolidated their programme into a single-car operation, fielding the number 4 BMW Z4 GT3 for Nobuteru Taniguchi and Tatsuya Kataoka.
 For their first full-season effort since 2005, Team Mugen replaced GT500-bound Daisuke Nakajima with former Honda GT500 driver Yuhki Nakayama in their hybrid-powered Honda CR-Z GT300.
 Subaru and R&D Sport changed tyre suppliers from Yokohama to Michelin for their second season with the BRZ GT300.
 Autobacs Racing Team Aguri changed vehicles from the ASL Garaiya to the Honda CR-Z GT300. Takashi Kobayashi joined ARTA's GT300 squad after two seasons in their GT500 team. The team also changed its number from 43 to 55.
 Two-time GT300 champion Kazuki Hoshino and reigning All-Japan Formula 3 National Class champion Daiki Sasaki, formed an all-new driver lineup at NDDP Racing.
 Bonds Racing, a new team established by members of the former Lexus Team Kraft, entered the series for the first time with a Nissan GT-R NISMO GT3 driven in the first round by Igor Sushko and Ryo Orime.
 Tomei Sports changed vehicles from the Callaway Corvette Z06.R GT3 to the Nissan GT-R NISMO GT3.
 Dijon Racing changed their primary number 48 team's vehicle to the Nissan GT-R NISMO GT3, and signed NDDP graduate Katsumasa Chiyo as their pro driver to partner amateur driver Hiroshi Takamori. Dijon Racing would continue to enter their Callaway Corvette Z06.R GT3 in select races with the number 96, driven by Masaki Tanaka and Keiichi Inoue.
 Team a Speed withdrew from the series after the 2012 season. Arnage Racing, the garage responsible for vehicle maintenance, took over the programme under their own name, fielding the number 50 Aston Martin V12 Vantage GT3 for drivers Masaki Kano and Hideto Yasuoka.
 Cars Tokai Dream28 changed vehicles from the Mooncraft Shiden to the newest McLaren MP4-12C GT3.
 Gainer switched allegiances from Audi to Mercedes-Benz, and expanded back to a two-car team with two SLS AMG GT3s. The all-pro number 11 car added former GT500 driver Björn Wirdheim as team mate to Katsuyuki Hiranaka, while Tetsuya Tanaka moved to the pro-am number 10 car alongside Masayuki Ueda.
 LEON Racing spun off from Shift after the 2012 season. Operated by K2 R&D Co. Ltd., LEON Racing fielded the number 62 Mercedes-Benz SLS AMG GT3 for Haruki Kurosawa and Masanobu Kato. Shift would partner with Okinawa-IMP (International Motorsports Project), fielding the number 52 Mercedes-Benz SLS AMG for team founder Hironori Takeuchi and Takeshi Tsuchiya.
 R'Qs Motor Sports changed vehicles from the Vemac RD320R to the Mercedes-Benz SLS AMG GT3.
 Hitotsuyama Racing scaled back to a single-car programme with their number 21 Audi R8 LMS Ultra driven by Akihiro Tsuzuki and 2004 GT500 champion Richard Lyons. The team also changed tyre suppliers from Yokohama to Hankook.
 Fairuz Fauzy began the season driving apr's number 30 Audi R8 LMS Ultra, alongside Yuki Iwasaki.
 JLOC consolidated their entry from four cars to three cars, all fielding the latest Lamborghini Gallardo GT3. Hiroki Yoshimoto transferred from the defunct Team a Speed to the number 87 JLOC entry alongside Hideki Yamauchi. Koji Yamanishi transferred to the number 86 car, joined by Shinya Hosokawa, who rejoined JLOC after a year away from the series.
 LMP Motorsport withdrew from the series after the 2012 season. Pacific Racing Team and the Nakanihon Automotive College (NAC), who supported their efforts in 2012, partnered with Direction Racing (who themselves returned to the series after a year's absence) and entered as Pacific Direction Racing. Their number 9 Porsche 911 GT3-R, promoting the new animated series Ghost in the Shell: ARISE, was driven by Shogo Mitsuyama and Yu Yokomaku.
 Team SGC and their Lexus IS 350 withdrew from the series after the 2012 season.

Mid-season changes

GT300 Class 

 Bonds Racing withdrew from the series after Igor Sushko and Yuji Ide finished fifth in the Fuji 500km. Sushko joined the number 30 apr crew from the third round in Sepang. In the fourth round, apr switched vehicles to Bonds' former Nissan GT-R NISMO GT3, and gained Freescale as a sponsor for the rest of the season.
 Tsubasa Kurosawa, the younger brother of Haruki, joined LEON Racing as a third driver for the Fuji 500km, then replaced Masanobu Kato for the rest of the season.
 After the third round, Team Mach replaced their Ferrari 458 GT3 with a Nissan GT-R NISMO GT3 from the Suzuka 1000km onwards.
 Third drivers for the Suzuka 1000km included Jörg Müller (GSR&Studie with Team UKYO), Carlo van Dam (Cars Tokai Dream28), Lucas Ordoñez (NDDP Racing), Tomoki Nojiri (ARTA), Yuichi Nakayama (apr #31), Akihiko Nakaya (LEON Racing), Naoya Gamou (Okinawa-IMP with Shift), Ryohei Sakaguchi (Arnage Racing), Naofumi Omoto (Team Mach), and Takuto Iguchi, who won the race as the third driver for R&D Sport.
 The NISMO Athlete Global Team entered as a one-off in the non-championship Fuji Sprint Cup race, with Ordoñez and Alex Buncombe driving the number 35 Nissan GT-R NISMO GT3.
 JLOC entered only a single Lamborghini Gallardo GT3 for Yoshimoto and Yamauchi in the Fuji Sprint Cup.

Calendar

Standings

GT500 Drivers
Scoring system

GT300 Drivers
Scoring system

JAF Grand Prix

GT500 Drivers

GT300 Drivers

References

External links
Super GT official website 

2013
 
Super GT